Union Township is one of the thirteen townships of Sherman County, Kansas, United States.  The population was 56 at the 2000 census.

Geography
Located in the eastern part of the county, it borders the following townships:
Llanos Township — north
West Hale Township, Thomas County — northeast
Kingery Township, Thomas County — southeast
Iowa Township — south
Washington Township — west
Shermanville Township — northwestern corner
It lies east of the county seat of Goodland.  There are no communities in the township.

Several intermittent headwaters of Sappa Creek flow through Union Township.

Transportation
Interstate 70 and U.S. Route 24 run concurrently east–west through Union Township.  A railroad line also travels east–west through Union Township, just north of the interstate.

Government
Union Township is currently inactive; by Kansas law, when a township becomes inactive, its powers and duties revert to the county government.

References

External links
County website

Townships in Sherman County, Kansas
Townships in Kansas